Simple & Crisp is a dried fruit company in Seattle, Washington that produces and sells "artisanal" dried apple, orange, pear and blood orange crackers.

History
Simple & Crisp was founded by Jane Yuan, a former publicist and marketing consultant. Yuan launched the company in late 2012.

The gluten-free fruit crackers created by Simple & Crisp are intended to be used as a pairing to foods such as cheese and desserts or garnishes to beverages such as champagne or cocktails.

The product is stocked at national retailers such as Whole Foods Market, Williams Sonoma and Dean & DeLuca.

References

Companies based in Seattle
Food and drink companies of the United States